The Adair County Courthouse, located in Greenfield, Iowa, United States, was built from 1891 to 1892. It was individually listed on the National Register of Historic Places in 1981 as a part of the County Courthouses in Iowa Thematic Resource. In 2014 it was included as a contributing property in the Greenfield Public Square Historic District. The courthouse is the third structure to house county courts and administration offices.

History
The county's first courthouse was located in Fontanelle from 1856 to 1874. It was a two-story frame building constructed from locally harvested wood. After the county seat moved to Greenfield the building was used as a school, church, meeting hall and town hall until it was destroyed in a fire in 1910. A two-story courthouse was built in Greenfield for $8,000. It was destroyed by fire in 1889 and courthouse functions moved to a nearby opera house until a new structure was completed. The cornerstone for the present courthouse was laid on July 4, 1891. It was constructed of brick in the Romanesque Revival style at a cost of $26,768.

Architecture
The 2½-story brick structure utilizes limestone for the high foundation, the water table, the belt courses at the top of the windows, the capitals of the brick pilasters, and for the arched surround that frames the main entrance. It is capped with a hip roof with gabled dormers. The building originally had a central tower that was removed at some point in the mid-twentieth century. Its significance is derived from its association with county government, and the political power and prestige of Greenfield as the county seat.

References

External links

Government buildings completed in 1892
Greenfield, Iowa
Romanesque Revival architecture in Iowa
Buildings and structures in Adair County, Iowa
Courthouses on the National Register of Historic Places in Iowa
County courthouses in Iowa
National Register of Historic Places in Adair County, Iowa
Individually listed contributing properties to historic districts on the National Register in Iowa